Pedro José de Arteta y Calisto (1797 in Quito – 24 August 1873) was Vice President of Ecuador from 1865 to 1869 and served briefly as President from 6 November 1867 to 20 January 1868. He was President of the Senate in 1839. He was the brother of Nicolás Joaquín de Arteta y Calisto, first Archbishop of Quito. He was a Conservative.

References 

1797 births
1873 deaths
People from Quito
Ecuadorian people of Basque descent
Conservative Party (Ecuador) politicians
Presidents of Ecuador
Vice presidents of Ecuador
Presidents of the Senate of Ecuador